Jiří Kornatovský (born 2 March 1952, Plasy, Czechoslovakia) is a Czech painter, draughtsman and printmaker.

Life 
Jiri Kornatovsky’s artistic standpoint and life opinions were formed mostly by his childhood and youth spent in Plasy, where he roamed almost daily, until the age of 21, in an abandoned Cistercian monastery.

After graduating from a technical teaching school in Pilsen, he studied at the College and High Art School of Vaclav Hollar in 1977-82, followed by the study of monumental painting at the Academy of Fine Arts in Prague with professors Arnošt Paderlík and Jiří Ptáček (1982–87).

At the end of the 1980s he published a number of spiritual manifestos and in 1991 he co-founded Hermit Foundation in the Cistercian monastery of Plasy. He created the Codes and Signs project at  the international art symposium Hermit 92. In the following years he attended study and creative residences in the Carmelite monastery in Sejny, Poland (1992), in Florence (1993), New York City and Boston (1994-1995) and Hohenosig, Germany (1997). During his stay in the USA he held a series of exhibitions and lectures. In 2005 and 2006 he worked in the Augustinian monastery at the Lesser Quarter in Prague and again he visited the United States (Los Angeles).

In the years 1998-99 he founded his own Gallery Hermit in Prague.

He works as a university professor at the Charles University in Prague and at the Art and Design Faculty, University of West Bohemia in Pilsen. He lectured at the School of the Museum of Fine Arts in Boston, where he carried out the legendary Burning lecture.  He introduced and defined the principle of his discovery of declarative drawing as a process method of artistic creation and the approach to it at a lecture in the Bachelard amphitheatre at the Sorbonne in Paris.

He says about himself that he does not know where the artistic work begins and the presence of everyday reality ends. Meditation in the process of the linear layering of the structure of the painting is always present even without him striving for it. He perceives analysis and interpretation in art as negative fragmentation of the painting and disintegration of the character of the self. He reflects the aesthetics of St. Augustine mainly when it comes to integration and wholeness.

Work 

Jiří Kornatovský is mostly known as an author of unique large black and white charcoal drawings of plastic objects on giant cardboard that gained him respect and recognition.
These drawings stand outside the Czech artistic tradition due to their artistic rendition, and when they first appeared on the art scene in the middle of the 1980s, they seemed to be an apparition.

In his approach, the drawing is mostly a record of its own creation, not a composition of form with arbitrary influence. Up to a certain point, it is a documentation of action. This action is of a psychological and physical character and is designed for private space and not for the public. The author is not primarily concerned with representation. His work is not about diversity of images and their individual messages. Kornatovský focuses on continuity, the repetition of actions of a ritual character. The subject is, therefore, rather a certain maintenance of the order of events in the rhythm of cyclical (archetypal) time.

Kornatovský’s "discovery" of the abstract object that is the carrier of the subjective experience and personal transformation is, by its own simplicity and the number of universal archetypal meanings, unique and independent. When considered in the history of art, it may be compared, for example, to the Black Suprematic square of Kazimir Malevich, White Paintings of Robert Rauschenberg, Morgenstern’s Fish’s Night Song or John Cage’s "4´33´´".

At the very beginning there were drawings and large graphic sheets depicting relationships (Two – Free variation on an hour of the lovers, 1988, etching, All at once, 1989, etching, GASK, And tickle, charcoal on paper, 200 x 380 cm, 1988), sometimes with a hidden erotic subtext (Shape of adventure, 1987). They are characterised by accurate execution and the use of abstract symbols derived from natural shapes. The composition of the event contains a secret. Space is not defined, the story pours over the horizon where we cannot see (Is anybody else coming? (Countryside), etching with aquatint, 1988, GASK), the outlined opening into the interior of the object offers only darkness but there is light coming out of the crack on the other side (One, 1988).

At the end of the 1980s Kornatovský drew abstract playful images dedicated to his family (… oh you people, 1989) and celebrating the joy of a newborn child (That and that and that-a-thing, 1988, charcoal on paper, 150 x 360 cm).

Giant objects from the beginning of the 1990s offer perfect spatial illusion of voluminous figures of organic shape (And out/aerial meditation, charcoal on cardboard, 220 x 500 cm, 1990–92, It, charcoal on cardboard 220 x 480 cm, 1989–92). The time range of their creation bears witness to how technically demanding these drawings are.

When interpreting the large-format drawing from the same period (From nowhere to nowhere – Forget everything/ You are what you cannot remember/, graphite, cardboard, 220 x 460 cm, 1990–97, GASK) it is necessary to also take into account the social atmosphere by the end of the 1980s and the seemingly hopeless situation of young artists, participants of the unofficial group Confrontations. According to the author, the drawing reflects feelings, in which the experience of a child is mixed with the empty spaces of an abandoned monastery and the situation of the confined space of a studio. Another variation on the same theme is a stark, almost technical drawing of a broken tube with a dark mouth (From nowhere to nowhere/silence, charcoal on cardboard, 220 x 480 cm, 1989).

The series of meditation drawings (Meditation by drawing) derives from Meditation (1990, exhibited 2006, Museum Kampa), where the plastic object in the shape of a toroid encloses some abstract country inside. The surface of the rotational body is sometimes disrupted and expands into space (In space, 1992). The torus itself represents a perfect shape that has neither end, nor beginning and optically centralises attention to the middle, just like the electric toroid coil, which induces the magnetic field in its centre (Prayer, charcoal 275 x 705 cm, 2000-20003, Meditation in archetype, combined technique on canvas, 210 x 220 cm, 2006, Meditation by archetype, combined technique on canvas, 210 x 220 cm, 2000-2010).

This shape also offers the possibility of mathematical transformation, during which the whole object can be turned inside out through eversion (like From nowhere to nowhere, 1990-7), to work in a 4D space and to decrease the central space through shortening of the axis, leading to  final degeneration into a sphere. (It, charcoal on cardboard, 220 x 480 cm, 1989–92).

The drawings, however, cannot be interpreted merely as a mathematical game. The author often creates them in a monastery cloister over the span of a few years and besides the artistic performance they are also a result of spiritual concentration connected with meditation. (To one point, charcoal on cardboard, 220 x 280 cm, 2000).

Objects depicted are neither anchored in space, nor related to earth. A mild asymmetry sometimes gives the impression of them growing upwards (Meditation by drawing, charcoal on cardboard, 600 x 220 cm, 1988–89). Titles of the meditation drawings offer riddles rather than explanations (Meditation eastern, 1990–97, 220 x 520 cm, Liturgic meditation, 1990–94).

The large format paintings sometimes only capture a part of the depicted object in order to leave space for pondering about the things that surpass us (Right left, Martin meditation, charcoal on cardboard, 220 x 540 cm, 1989–93, Eternal story, charcoal on cardboard, 220 x 500 cm, 1990–94, Sanctus, charcoal on cardboard, 220 x 520 cm, 1997–99), or they directly refer to infinity (88.88.88., combined technique on canvas, 100 x 120 cm, 2010). Organic form in the drawing resembling a gastrula can be interpreted as an immersion of what was on the surface into the inside, into the darkness, into the closure from the outside world (Remembering an idea, charcoal on canvas, 210 x 240 cm, 2005-6).

The key to understanding Kornatovský’s drawings may be St. Augustine’s treatise on the reflection of the world of ideas and sensory reality (Augustine, charcoal on paper, 280 x 340 cm, 2000-3, St. Augustine II, combined technique on canvas, 140 x 160 cm, 2007, Contemplation, charcoal on canvas, 80 x 100 cm, 2008).

Awards 
 1994	Mayor of Kraków Award, Graphic Art Triennial, Kraków, Poland
 2008	Laureate of the Franz Kafka Prague circle Award

Representation in collections 
 National Gallery of Art, Washington, USA 
 National Gallery in Prague, Czech Republic
 Queensland Art Gallery, Brisbane, Australia
 Museum Kampa, Meda Mládková collection, Prague, Czech Republic 
 GASK – the Gallery of the Central Bohemian Region, Kutná hora, Czech Republic
 West Bohemian Gallery, Pilsen, Czech Republic
 Aleš South Bohemian Gallery, Hluboká nad Vltavou, Czech Republic
 Klatovy/Klenová Gallery, Czech Republic
 Gallery of Modern Art Roudnice nad Labem, Czech Republic
 Regional Gallery Karlovy Vary, Czech Republic
 Regional Gallery Liberec, Czech Republic
 Consulate General of the Czech Republic, Los Angeles, USA 
 Bellini Gallery, Florence, Italy
 Artists Centre, Eindhoven, The Netherlands 
 Kentler International Drawing Center, New York, USA 
 Private collections in Czech Republic and abroad

Selected solo exhibitions 

 2014  Intuiti Gallery, Paris, France
 2013 Michel Journiac Gallery - Sorbonne, Paris, France
Galerie du Tableau, (with Richard Conte), Marseille, France
Hollar Gallery, Prague, Czech Republic
 2012 Bottega Gallery, Kyiv, Ukraine
 2009 Takasaki City Gallery, Japan (with J. Váchal)
 2008 Parliament of the Czech Republic, Prague, Czech Republic
 2006 ASTO Museum, Los Angeles, USA (with K. Czerpak)
Museum Kampa, Prague, Czech Republic
Pilsen City Gallery, Czech Republic
 2004 The world paper, Frankfurt, Germany
 2003 National Gallery in Prague, Czech Republic
 1997 Hermit Gallery, Prague,  Czech Republic
 1995 Kentler International Drawing Space, New York City
PAAS gallery, New York City
 1994  Boston Center for the Arts
School of the Museum of Fine Arts, Boston
PAAS gallery, New York City
 1993 Nová síň Gallery, Prague, Czech Republic
 1992 The Hague City Hall
 1991 OKO Gallery, Amsterdam
Plasy monastery, Czech Republic
Kortenhoef, North Holland
 1990 St. Nicholas Church, Prague, Czech Republic
 1985 Plasy monastery, Czech Republic
 1980 Plasy monastery, Czech Republic

Group exhibitions 
 Jiří Kornatovský participated in more than 200 group exhibitions both at home and abroad

References

Publications 
 (cz)Jiří Kornatovský : Meditace kresbou, 2011, Fenclová H, Pangrácová L, Kroupová M, kat. nestr., G. Klatovy/Klenová , OG Liberec, 
 (cz, jap) Jiří Kornatovský a Josef Váchal: Hory a srdce, 2009, Hucl I., Klínková H., Jindra P., Hánová M., Fišer M., sborník, 96 str., Muzeum Šumavy Sušice, 
 (cz, en, jap) Jiří Kornatovský, 2006, Binder I, Mládková M, kat. 12 s., Nadace J a M Mládkových, 
 (cz, en) Jiří Kornatovský: Meditace kresbou / Meditation in drawing, 2003, Janištinová Jirková A, Raimanová I, kat. 36 s., NG Praha, 
 (cz) Jiří Kornatovský: Meditace - modlitby, 2003, Kornatovský J, Koval M, kat. 8s., G. J. Jílka, Šumperk
 (cz) Jiří Kornatovský: Kresby, 2002, Tetiva V, kat. 32 s., AJG Hluboká, 
 (en) Jiří Kornatovský: Graphic Drawings, 1995, Pánková M, kat. 4 s., PAAS Gallery, New York
 (cz) Jiří Kornatovský: Kresby, 1994, tx. Kornatovský J, G. Klatovy/Klenová
 (cz) Jiří Kornatovský: Kresby, 1991, Pánková M, Vojtěchovský M, kat. 20 s., Unie výtvarných umělců České republiky, Praha
 (cz, en, fr, de) Jiří Kornatovský: Nototo (Kresby, grafika), 1989, Raimanová I, kat. 4 s., klášter Plasy
 (cz) Jiří Kornatovský: Kresby, grafika, obrazy, 1989, Machalický J, kat. 8+1 s., SČVU, Praha
 (cz) Jiří Kornatovský: Kresby, grafika, 1988, Kotalík J, kat. 8 s., PKO KS Hroznová

Encyclopaedia 
 (cz) Slovník českých a slovenských výtvarných umělců 1950 - 2001, 2001, Pavliňák P, Výtvarné centrum Chagall, Ostrava, 
 (cz) Nová encyklopedie českého výtvarného umění, 1995, Horová A, Academia, Praha, 
 (cz, en) Grafika: Obrazová encyklopedie české grafiky osmdesátých let / Pictorial Encyclopaedia of the Czech prints of the 1980s, 1993, Hošková Vomočilová S, Schleppe S, Středoevropská galerie a nakladatelství, Praha,

External links 
 Information system abART: Kornatovský Jiří
 Faculty of Fine Art and Design, West-Bohemian University in Pilsen:Jiří Kornatovský

1952 births
Czech painters
Czech male painters
Living people
Academic staff of Charles University
Academic staff of the University of West Bohemia
People from Plasy